Sungai Besar or Sungei Besar may refer to:
Sungai Besar
Sungai Besar (federal constituency), represented in the Dewan Rakyat
Sungai Besar (state constituency), formerly represented in the Selangor State Legislative Assembly (1959–2004)